Wilson is a town in Carter County, Oklahoma, United States. The population was 1,724 at the 2010 census. It is part of the Ardmore, Oklahoma Micropolitan Statistical Area. It is home to one of the oldest Assemblies of God churches in Oklahoma, the Wilson Assembly of God Church.

History 
John Ringling (of Ringling Brothers fame) in 1913 built his Oklahoma, New Mexico and Pacific Railway west from Ardmore to the spot that would become Wilson.  Ringling himself chose the name-- originally “New Wilson”--- as a tribute to Charles Wilson, manager of the Ringling Brothers Circus.  A post office was established on January 17, 1914; the town voted to incorporate the same year; and, the name changed to Wilson in 1918.

The murder of Jared Lakey in 2019 achieved national attention.

Geography
Wilson is located in southwestern Carter County at  (34.161492, -97.425078). U.S. Highway 70 passes through the city north of the populated center; it leads east  to Ardmore, the Carter County seat, and west  to Waurika.

Demographics

As of the census of 2000, there were 1,584 people, 625 households, and 426 families residing in the city. The population density was 278.3 people per square mile (107.5/km). There were 785 housing units at an average density of 137.9 per square mile (53.3/km). The racial makeup of the city was 89.71% White, 0.25% African American, 6.57% Native American, 0.44% Asian, 0.44% from other races, and 2.59% from two or more races. Hispanic or Latino of any race were 1.83% of the population.

There were 625 households, out of which 31.4% had children under the age of 18 living with them, 52.2% were married couples living together, 11.4% had a female householder with no husband present, and 31.8% were non-families. 29.9% of all households were made up of individuals, and 17.9% had someone living alone who was 65 years of age or older. The average household size was 2.45 and the average family size was 3.03.

In the city, the population was spread out, with 26.5% under the age of 18, 7.8% from 18 to 24, 23.9% from 25 to 44, 21.5% from 45 to 64, and 20.2% who were 65 years of age or older. The median age was 38 years. For every 100 females, there were 89.0 males. For every 100 females age 18 and over, there were 84.5 males.

The median income for a household in the city was $22,667, and the median income for a family was $28,199. Males had a median income of $29,063 versus $17,619 for females. The per capita income for the city was $11,258. About 15.4% of families and 20.8% of the population were below the poverty line, including 27.0% of those under age 18 and 18.3% of those age 65 or over.

Historic Landmark

The Healdton Oil Field Bunkhouse, just north of Wilson, is NRHP-listed.

References

External links
 Wilson Public Schools

Cities in Carter County, Oklahoma
Cities in Oklahoma
Ardmore, Oklahoma micropolitan area